Oberlin Gardens is an unincorporated community in Swatara Township in Dauphin County, Pennsylvania. It is located in the Harrisburg–Carlisle metropolitan statistical area.

References

External links 
Oberlin Gardens profile at Hometown Locator

Harrisburg–Carlisle metropolitan statistical area
Unincorporated communities in Dauphin County, Pennsylvania
Unincorporated communities in Pennsylvania